is a Japanese voice actress. She won the Best Rookie Actress award at the 13th Seiyu Awards.

Filmography

Anime series

Anime films

Video games

References

External links
 Official agency profile 
 

1998 births
Living people
Japanese video game actresses
Japanese voice actresses
Seiyu Award winners
Voice actresses from Saitama Prefecture
21st-century Japanese actresses